is a single by the Japanese idol girl group Not Yet. It reached number one on the Oricon Singles Chart.

References

Not Yet (band) songs
2013 singles
Oricon Weekly number-one singles
Billboard Japan Hot 100 number-one singles
Japanese-language songs
2013 songs
Nippon Columbia singles
Song articles with missing songwriters